Keonthal State, covering an area of 482 km2, was one of  the Princely states of India during the period of the British Raj. Its capital was Junga. Keonthal acceded to India on 15 April 1948. Currently, it is part of the Indian state of Himachal Pradesh.

History
According to tradition there was a predecessor state founded around 765 AD.
The state of Keonthal was founded before the 19th century. It was ruled by Rana Raghunath Sen until its occupation by Nepal under General Amar Singh Thapa from 1803 to 1814. After the occupation, Sansar Sen ruled as the Rana from 1814 till 24 July 1858 when he took the title of Raja.

After the Gurkha War in 1815, a portion of Keonthal, which had been occupied by the Gurkhas, was sold to the maharaja of Patiala, the remainder being restored to its hereditary chief.

Keonthal's first capital was Koti, 9 kilometres from the hill station of Chail after which the capital was shifted to Junga.

Rulers
The heads of the state bore the title 'Rana' until 1858.

Ranas 
.... – ....                Bhup Sen 
1801 – 1803                Raghunath Sen (1st time)           (d. 1831) 
1803 – 1814                occupied by Nepal 
1814 – 1831                Raghunath Sen (2nd time)           (s.a.) 
1831 – 24 Jul 1858         Sansar Sen                         (d. 1862)

Rajas
24 July 1858 – 1862  Sansar Sen
1862 – 1882  Mahendra Sen
1882 – 1901  Balbir Sen
1901 – 1916  Bije Sen
2 February 1916 – 15 August 1947  Hemendra Sen (b. 1905)

References

External links
Keonthal Princely State

Princely states of India
History of Himachal Pradesh
States and territories disestablished in 1948
Rajputs
18th-century establishments in India
1948 disestablishments in India